John Oakley may refer to:

John Oakley (surveyor) (1867–1946), British surveyor
John C. Oakley (1946–2006), American neurosurgeon
John Oakley (cricketer) (1925–2013), New Zealand cricketer
John Oakley (priest) (1834–1890), English divine and former Dean of Manchester Cathedral, 1884–1890